The Women's FIH Hockey Junior World Cup, formerly known as the Women's Hockey Junior World Cup, is the field hockey Junior World Cup competition for women, with the format for qualification and the final tournament similar to the men's.

It is organized by the International Hockey Federation (FIH) and has been played since 1989. The tournament features players who are under 21 years of age and is held once every two years.

Four teams have dominated in past events. Netherlands is the most successful team, having won the tournament four times, this followed by Korea and Argentina. Germany have won the tournament once.

In response to the 2022 Russian invasion of Ukraine, the FIH banned Russia from the 2022 Women's FIH Hockey Junior World Cup, and banned Russian and Belarusian officials from FIH events.

Results

Summary

* = hosts
^ = includes result representing West Germany in 1989
# = states that have since split into two or more independent nations

Team appearances

^ = includes result representing West Germany in 1989
# = states that have since split into two or more independent nations

Argentina, Korea, Germany, and Netherlands are the only teams to have competed at each Junior World Cup; 31 teams have competed in at least one Junior World Cup.

Debut of teams

See also
Men's FIH Hockey Junior World Cup
Women's FIH Hockey World Cup

References

External links
 USA field hockey: Women's Hockey Junior World Cup 2001
 Women's Hockey Junior World Cup 2005 Results Book

 
Junior
Hockey
Recurring sporting events established in 1989